1976–77 was the sixty-fourth occasion on which the Lancashire Cup completion had been held.
 
Widnes won the trophy  by beating Workington Town by the score of 16-11

The match was played at Central Park, Wigan, (historically in the county of Lancashire). The attendance was 9,399 and receipts were £6,414.00

Background 

The total number of teams entering the competition remained at last season’s total of 14 with  no junior/amateur clubs taking part.

The same fixture format was retained, but due to the number of participating clubs, this resulted in one  “blank” or “dummy” fixture in the first round, and one bye in the second round.

Competition and results

Round 1 
Involved  7 matches (with one “blank” fixture) and 14 clubs

Round 2 - Quarter-finals 
Involved 3 matches (with one bye) and 7 clubs

Round 3 – Semi-finals  
Involved 2 matches and 4 clubs

Round 3 – Semi-finals - replays  
Involved 1 match and 2 clubs

Final

Teams and scorers 

Scoring - Try = three points - Goal = two points - Drop goal = one point

The road to success

Notes and comments 
1 * News of the World Football annual of 1976–77 has the score as 17-11 - other publications and archived records e.g. Widnes official archives have the score as 16-11
        
2 * Rothmans Rugby League Yearbook 1991-92 gives the attendance as 7,566 - RUGBYLEAGUEprojects give the attendance as 9,399

3 * Central Park was the home ground of Wigan with a final capacity of 18,000, although the record attendance was  47,747 for Wigan v St Helens 27 March 1959

See also 
1976–77 Northern Rugby Football League season
Rugby league county cups

References

External links
Saints Heritage Society
1896–97 Northern Rugby Football Union season at wigan.rlfans.com 
Hull&Proud Fixtures & Results 1896/1897
Widnes Vikings - One team, one passion Season In Review - 1896-97
The Northern Union at warringtonwolves.org

1976 in English rugby league
RFL Lancashire Cup